The following are institutions that form part of the University of Cambridge.

Schools, faculties, and departments
The largest academic subdivision of the university are the six schools; Arts and Humanities, Biological Sciences, Clinical Medicine, Humanities and Social Sciences, Physical Sciences, and Technology. The schools are then divided into faculties and departments.

School of Arts and Humanities
 Faculty of Architecture and History of Art
 Department of Architecture
 Department of History of Art
 Faculty of Asian and Middle Eastern Studies
Department of East Asian Studies
 Department of Middle Eastern Studies
 Faculty of Classics
 Faculty of Divinity
 Faculty of English
 Department of Anglo-Saxon, Norse and Celtic
 Faculty of Modern and Medieval Languages and Linguistics 
 Faculty of Music
 Faculty of Philosophy
 Centre for Research in the Arts, Social Sciences and Humanities
 Centre for the Study of Existential Risk
 Language Centre

School of the Biological Sciences
 Faculty of Biology
 Department of Biochemistry
 Department of Genetics
 Department of Pathology
 Department of Pharmacology
 Department of Physiology, Development and Neuroscience
 Department of Plant Sciences
 Botanic Garden
 Department of Psychology
 Department of Zoology
 Museum of Zoology
 Centre for Family Research
 Faculty of Veterinary Medicine
 Veterinary School
 Gurdon Institute
 Sainsbury Laboratory
 Wellcome–MRC Cambridge Stem Cell Institute
 Cambridge Systems Biology Centre
 MRC Toxicology Unit

School of Clinical Medicine
Faculty of Clinical Medicine
 Department of Clinical Biochemistry
 Department of Clinical Neurosciences
 Department of Haematology
 Department of Medical Genetics
 Department of Medicine
 Department of Obstetrics & Gynaecology
 Department of Oncology
 Department of Paediatrics
 Department of Psychiatry
 Department of Public Health & Primary Care
 Department of Radiology
 Department of Surgery
 MRC Biostatistics Unit
 MRC Cancer Unit
 MRC Cognition and Brain Sciences Unit
 MRC Epidemiology Unit
 MRC Mitochondrial Biology Unit
 Cancer Research UK Cambridge Institute
 Cambridge Institute for Medical Research
 Welcome Trust–MRC Institute of Metabolic Science
 Institute of Public Health

School of the Humanities and Social Sciences
 Faculty of Human, Social and Political Science
 Department of Archaeology
 McDonald Institute for Archaeological Research
 Department of Social Anthropology
 Museum of Archaeology and Anthropology
 Department of Sociology
 Department of Politics and International Studies
Faculty of Economics
 Faculty of Education
 Faculty of History
 Faculty of Law
 Institute of Criminology
 Lauterpacht Centre for International Law
 Department of History and Philosophy of Science
 Department of Land Economy

School of the Physical Sciences
 Faculty of Earth Sciences and Geography
 Department of Earth Sciences
 Godwin Laboratory
 Sedgwick Museum of Earth Sciences
 Institute of Theoretical Geophysics
 Department of Geography
 Scott Polar Research Institute
 Faculty of Mathematics
 Department of Applied Mathematics and Theoretical Physics
 Centre for Theoretical Cosmology
 Institute of Theoretical Geophysics
 Department of Pure Mathematics and Mathematical Statistics
 Faculty of Physics and Chemistry
 Institute of Astronomy
 Department of Chemistry
 Department of Materials Science and Metallurgy
 Department of Physics (Cavendish Laboratory)
 Isaac Newton Institute

School of Technology
 Faculty of Engineering
 Department of Engineering
 Institute for Manufacturing
 Faculty of Business and Management
 Judge Business School
 Faculty of Computer Science and Technology
 Department of Computer Science and Technology
 Department of Chemical Engineering and Biotechnology
 Cambridge Institute for Sustainability Leadership

Colleges

The University of Cambridge has 31 colleges:

 Christ's College, Cambridge
 Churchill College, Cambridge
 Clare College, Cambridge
 Clare Hall, Cambridge
 Corpus Christi College, Cambridge
 Darwin College, Cambridge
 Downing College, Cambridge
 Emmanuel College, Cambridge
 Fitzwilliam College, Cambridge
 Girton College, Cambridge
 Gonville and Caius College, Cambridge
 Homerton College, Cambridge
 Hughes Hall, Cambridge
 Jesus College, Cambridge
 King's College, Cambridge
 Lucy Cavendish College, Cambridge
 Magdalene College, Cambridge
 Murray Edwards College, Cambridge
 Newnham College, Cambridge
 Pembroke College, Cambridge
 Peterhouse, Cambridge
 Queens' College, Cambridge
 Robinson College, Cambridge
 St Catharine's College, Cambridge
 St Edmund's College, Cambridge
 St John's College, Cambridge
 Selwyn College, Cambridge
 Sidney Sussex College, Cambridge
 Trinity College, Cambridge
 Trinity Hall, Cambridge
 Wolfson College, Cambridge

Other
 ADC Theatre
 Cambridge Assessment - formerly known as the University of Cambridge Local Examinations Syndicate
 Cambridge University Library
 Cambridge University Press
 Institute of Continuing Education
 Millennium Mathematics Project
 University of Cambridge Museums
 Fitzwilliam Museum
 Hamilton Kerr Institute
 Kettle's Yard
 Museum of Archaeaology and Anthropology
 Museum of Classical Archaeology
 Polar Museum
 Sedgwick Museum of Earth Sciences
 Museum of Zoology
 Whipple Museum of the History of Science

University sites
 Cambridge Bio-Medical Campus
 Cambridge Science Park
 Downing Site
 New Museums Site
 Sidgwick Site
 West Cambridge

See also
 List of organisations and institutions associated with the University of Cambridge

References

Institutions of the University of Cambridge
University of Cambridge-related lists